Fucus vesiculosus, known by the common names bladder wrack,  black tang, rockweed, sea grapes, bladder fucus, sea oak, cut weed, dyers fucus, red fucus and rock wrack, is a seaweed found on the coasts of the North Sea, the western Baltic Sea and the Atlantic and Pacific Oceans. It was the original source of iodine, discovered in 1811, and was used extensively to treat goitre, a swelling of the thyroid gland related to iodine deficiency.

Description
It is attached by a basal disc-shaped holdfast. It has almost spherical air bladders, which are usually paired one on either side of the mid-rib but may be absent in young plants. The margin is smooth and the frond is dichotomously branched. It is sometimes confused with Fucus spiralis with which it hybridises and is similar to Fucus serratus.

Distribution
Fucus vesiculosus is a common large alga on the shores of the British Isles. It has been recorded from the Atlantic shores of Europe, Northern Russia, the Baltic Sea, Greenland, Azores, Canary Islands, Morocco and Madeira. It is also found on the Atlantic coast of North America from Ellesmere Island, Hudson Bay to North Carolina.

Ecology
The species is especially common on sheltered shores from the middle littoral to lower intertidal levels. It is rare on exposed shores, where any specimens may be short, stunted and without the air vesicles. F. vesiculosus supports few colonial organisms but provides a canopy and shelter for the tube worm Spirorbis spirorbis, herbivorous isopods such as Idotea and surface-grazing snails such as Littorina obtusata. Phlorotannins in Fucus vesiculosus act as chemical defenses against the marine herbivorous snail Littorina littorea., while galactolipids act as herbivore deterrents against the sea urchin Arbacia punctulata. Methyl jasmonate may induce the phlorotannins production. Fucophlorethol A is a type of phlorotannin found in F. vesiculosus.

Biology
Plants of F. vesiculosus are dioecious. Gametes are generally released into the seawater under calm conditions, and the eggs are fertilized externally to produce a zygote. Eggs are fertilized shortly after being released from the receptacle. A study on the coast of Maine showed that there was 100% fertilization at both exposed and sheltered sites. Continuously submerged populations in the Baltic Sea are very responsive to turbulent conditions. High fertilization success is achieved because the gametes are released only when water velocities are low.

Individuals of F. vesiculosus from the North Sea colonized the Baltic Sea less than 8 000 years ago. The event is paralleled by a switch from what seems to be obligate sexual recruitment to facultative asexual recruitment. Asexual reproduction in Baltic Sea populations is accomplished by the production of adventitious branches that come loose and reattach to the bottom by the formation of rhizoids. Adventitious branches are present in thalli of F. vesiculosus in other areas too but asexual formation of new thalli has never been reported outside the Baltic Sea.

Consumption
Fucus vesiculosus is sold as a nutritional supplement.  Primary chemical constituents include mucilage, algin, mannitol, fucitol, beta-carotene, zeaxanthin, volatile oils, iodine, bromine, potassium and other minerals.

Adverse effects
Consumption of F. vesiculosus can cause platelet inhibition, which may potentiate the anticoagulant activity of warfarin (Coumadin).  It should be avoided before surgery.

Some people may suffer an allergic reaction to the iodine in F. vesiculosus.

See also
 Edible seaweed
 Iodine § Allergic reactions

References

External links
 
 
 
 
 
 
 

Edible algae
Flora of Alaska
Edible seaweeds
Biota of the Arctic Ocean
Biota of the Atlantic Ocean
Biota of the Baltic Sea
Biota of the North Sea
Species described in 1753
Taxa named by Carl Linnaeus
Flora without expected TNC conservation status
Fucaceae